The 2009 Island Games in Åland was the 11th edition in which a men's football (soccer) tournament was played at the multi-games competition. It was contested by 16 teams.

Jersey won the tournament for the third time.

Participants

 Isle of Man

Group Phase

Group A

Group B

Group C

Group D

Placement play-off matches

15th place match

13th place match

11th place match

9th place match

7th place match

5th place match

Final stage

Semi-finals

3rd place match

Final

Final rankings

Top goalscorers

5 goals
  Lee Casciaro
  Ross Allen

4 goals
  Pavia Mølgaard
  David Mas

3 goals
 Melvin McGinnes

 Andreas Kraft 
 Dave Rihoy
 Simon Tostevin
 Stephen Glover
 Calum Morrissey
 Alexander Weckström
 Leighton Flaws
 Erik Thomson

See also
Women's Football at the 2009 Island Games

External links
Official 2009 website

Men
2009
Gibraltar in international football